The Popular National Party (PONA) is a political party in Tanzania.PONA was led by politician and businessman  Wilfred R. Mwakitwange. Pona was founded and established in 1992 and got full registration in April 1993. Later in 2000 the party claimed to have 1.5 million members, however, this number does not reflect their support in Tanzanian 2000 election as support of the group was supported by only 0.7% and mathematically speaking this doesn't make sense as the population at that time was about 34.178 million[3] and 1.5 million divided by 34.178 million is slight under 4.4% meaning if the political group was as big as claimed the political group would have at least 4.4% public approval. So the exact number of members remains unknown to the general public. The political party of PONA got deregistered in 2005 after the (presumed ) death of leader Wilfred Mwakitwange. Not much public information is known about his death however the collapse of PONA is definite.

1992 establishments in Tanzania
Political parties established in 1992
Political parties in Tanzania